This is a list of awards and nominations received by Pentagon, a South Korean boy band formed by Cube Entertainment, since their debut in 2016.


Awards and nominations

Notes

References

Awards
Pentagon